Idiology is a studio album by German electronica duo Mouse on Mars. It was released in 2001.

Critical reception
At Metacritic, which assigns a weighted average score out of 100 to reviews from mainstream critics, Idiology received an average score of 83% based on 14 reviews, indicating "universal acclaim".

Pitchfork placed it at number 12 on the "Top 20 Albums of 2001" list.

Track listing

Personnel
Credits adapted from liner notes.

 Jan St. Werner – composition, production, lyrics
 Andi Toma – composition, production, lyrics
 Dodo Nkishi – vocals, lyrics
 Matti Rouse – vocals
 Harald Sack Ziegler – french horn, trumpet
 Peter Stahlhofen – trumpet
 Isolde Hermanns – clarinet, bass clarinet
 Miriam Hardenberg – cello
 Sebastian Reimann – violin
 Hartmut Frank – viola
 Matthew Herbert – piano
 Alois Andre – guitar
 Josef Höltgen – bass guitar, double bass
 Uli Thiesz – drums
 Adam Butler – electronics
 F.X.Randomiz – programming

References

External links
 
 

2001 albums
Mouse on Mars albums
Domino Recording Company albums
Thrill Jockey albums